The beetle subfamily Megalopodinae is the largest group within the family Megalopodidae. Species in the subfamily are mostly tropical in distribution, and their larvae typically bore inside of plant stems.

It contains the following genera:

 Agathomerus Lacordaire, 1845
 Antonaria Jacoby & Clavareau, 1905
 Ateledera Lacordaire, 1845
 Barticaria Jacoby & Clavareau, 1905
 Bothromegalopus Monrós, 1947
 Bryantonaria Pic, 1951
 Falsocolobaspis Pic, 1942
 Falsotemnaspis Pic, 1951
 Homalopterus Perty, 1832
 Kuilua Jacoby, 1894
 Leucastea Stål, 1855
 Macroantonaria Pic, 1951
 Macrolopha Weise, 1902
 Mastostethus Lacordaire, 1845
 Megalopus Fabricius, 1801
 Mimocolobaspis Pic, 1951
 Nickimerus Guérin, 1948
 Piomelopus Jacoby & Clavareau, 1905
 Plesioagathomerus Monrós, 1945
 Poecilomorpha Hope, 1840
 Pseudohomalopterus Pic, 1920
 Pseudomegalopus Pic, 1916
 Sphondylia Weise, 1902
 Temnaspis Lacordaire, 1845

References

Megalopodidae
Beetle subfamilies